Sir Christopher Mark Le Brun PPRA (born 1951) is a British artist, known primarily as a painter. He was President of the Royal Academy of Arts from the time of his election in 2011 to December 2019. Le Brun was knighted in the 2021 New Year Honours for services to the arts.

Biography
Le Brun was born in Portsmouth in 1951. From 1970-74,  he studied for the DFA at Slade School of Art and for an MA at Chelsea College of Arts between 1974–75. He has taught and lectured at art schools, including Brighton, the Slade, Chelsea, Wimbledon and Royal Drawing School. His first solo exhibition was in 1980 with Nigel Greenwood Gallery and soon after he was included in international exhibitions such as the Venice Biennale and Zeitgeist at Martin-Gropius-Bau, Berlin. His international art include, "An International Survey of Recent Painting and Sculpture" at the Museum of Modern Art, New York in 1984, "Avant-garde in the Eighties" at the Los Angeles County Museum of Art in 1987 and "Contemporary Voices" at MoMA in 2005.

He was one of the five artists shortlisted for a monumental sculpture commission, the Ebbsfleet Landmark (Angel of the South) in 2008. In 2011, he was the chief co-ordinator of the Royal Academy Summer Exhibition. On 8 December 2011, he was elected president of the Royal Academy and interviewed about his role by the Guardian Professional Networks in 2013. During his presidency, he was closely involved in the most significant redevelopment in the academy’s 250 year history. Le Brun stepped down in December 2019. He lives and works in London and is married to the artist Charlotte Verity.

Printmaking

Le Brun is an experienced printmaker working in etching, lithography, woodcut and monotype. He had long term collaborations with Peter Kosowicz and Simon Marsh of the former Hope Sufferance Press as well as Paupers Press in London, Garner and Richard Tullis in Santa Barbara, Michael Woolworth Publications in Paris and Graphic Studio in Dublin. Most recently, he has been working to great acclaim with Paragon Press in London.

Works

City Wing, 2009–13, 1,050 x 325 x 60 cm, bronze. A monumental sculpture was installed on Threadneedle Walk in Bank, London in 2013.
A cast of his large bronze sculpture, Union (Horse with Two Discs) 1999–2000, was acquired by and installed at the entrance to the Museum of London in 2005. This was Le Brun's first large scale bronze.

Notable publications include Seven Lithographs 1989, Fifty Etchings 1991, Four Riders 1993, Wagner 1994, Motif Light 1998, Paris Lithographs 2000, Fifty Etchings 2005, Seria Ludo 2015–2016, Composer 2017, Doubles 2018, New Painting 2018.

Public collections
His work can be found in museum collections including the Museum of Modern Art and the Metropolitan Museum of Art, New York; Yale Center for British Art, New Haven; Tate, the V&A and the British Museum, London; and Art Gallery of New South Wales, Sydney.

References

External links
 
 
 Profile on website Royal Academy of Arts
 
 Lisson Gallery, London
 Albertz Benda, New York

Living people
1951 births
Artists from Portsmouth
Alumni of the Slade School of Fine Art
English sculptors
English male sculptors
20th-century English painters
English male painters
21st-century English painters
English printmakers
Royal Academicians
20th-century British sculptors
21st-century sculptors
Knights Bachelor
20th-century English male artists
21st-century English male artists
Neo-expressionist artists